Loveblows & Lovecries – A Confession is the debut album of British art rock band No-Man. It was released in the UK by One Little Indian Records label in May, 1993, and in a slightly different format in the US on 550 Music in May, 1994.

"Taking It Like a Man", a single taken from the US version of the album reached number 34 on the Billboard Dance Chart in April 1994 and was used on the US TV drama, Models, Inc.

Critically lauded at the time of its release, the album was considered by the likes of UK magazines Melody Maker and Lime Lizard as an intriguing combination of art rock ambition, synthpop textures, and infectious pop hooks.

Track listing

LP and Cassette Release

Side one
 "Loveblow" – 1:24
 "Only Baby" – 3:47
 "Housekeeping" – 5:29
 "Sweetheart Raw" – 6:04
 "Lovecry" – 4:52

Side two
 "Tulip" – 3:56
 "Break Heaven" – 4:59
 "Beautiful and Cruel" – 4:48
 "Painting Paradise" – 7:32
 "Heaven's Break" – 4:01

UK CD Release
 "Loveblow" – 1:24
 "Only Baby" – 3:47
 "Housekeeping" – 5:29
 "Sweetheart Raw" – 6:04
 "Lovecry" – 4:52
 "Tulip" – 3:56
 "Break Heaven" – 4:59
 "Beautiful and Cruel" – 4:48
 "Painting Paradise" – 7:32
 "Heaven's Break" – 4:01

Limited Edition Double CD Release
Includes the EP Lovesighs – An Entertainment as a bonus disc.

Disc one
 "Loveblow" – 1:24
 "Only Baby" – 3:47
 "Housekeeping" – 5:29
 "Sweetheart Raw" – 6:04
 "Lovecry" – 4:52
 "Tulip" – 3:56
 "Break Heaven" – 4:59
 "Beautiful and Cruel" – 4:48
 "Painting Paradise" – 7:32
 "Heaven's Break" – 4:01

Disc two
 "Heartcheat Pop" – 3:52
 "Days in the Trees – Mahler" – 6:21
 "Drink Judas" – 3:44
 "Heartcheat Motel" – 4:38
 "Kiss Me Stupid" – 4:42
 "Colours" – 4:10
 "Iris Murdoch Cut Me Up" – 5:19
 "Days in the Trees – Reich" – 2:35

US CD Release
The US edition additionally includes "Taking It Like a Man" and a remix of the single "Days in the Trees".
 "Loveblow" – 1:24
 "Only Baby" – 3:47
 "Housekeeping" – 5:29
 "Sweetheart Raw" – 6:04
 "Lovecry" – 4:52
 "Tulip" – 3:56
 "Taking It Like a Man" – 6:54
 "Break Heaven" – 4:59
 "Beautiful and Cruel" – 4:48
 "Days in the Trees: Mahler" – 7:03
 "Painting Paradise" – 7:32
 "Heaven's Break" – 4:01

Personnel
Group members:
Tim Bowness – vocals, words
Ben Coleman – violin
Steven Wilson – instruments
Additional performers:
Richard Barbieri – keyboards on "Sweetheart Raw"
Richard Felix – cello on "Loveblow"
Steve Jansen – drum programming on "Sweetheart Raw"
Mick Karn – fretless bass on "Sweetheart Raw"

Release history

References

1993 debut albums
No-Man albums
One Little Independent Records albums